Tomoefuji Toshihide (born 27 January 1971 as Toshihide Kurosawa) is a former sumo wrestler from Akita Prefecture, Japan. His highest rank was komusubi.

Career
Born in Kazuno, he was scouted by yokozuna Chiyonofuji after winning several children's sumo competitions in his native Akita Prefecture. At junior high school he was a rival of the future Wakanohana. He joined Chiyonofuji's Kokonoe stable and made his professional debut in May 1986. He made the sandanme division in November 1987 but then missed two tournaments and fell back to the lowest jonokuchi division. In July 1988 he won his first (and only) yusho or tournament championship in the jonidan division with a perfect 7-0 record. He reached the third highest makushita division a year later.

While in the makushita division he performed the yumitori-shiki or bow-twirling ceremony that takes place at the end of every tournament day, from 1989 to 1990. He reached sekitori status in July 1990 upon promotion to the jūryō division and in January 1991 made his debut in the makuuchi top division. He scored ten wins in his debut and was awarded the Fighting Spirit sansho or special prize. Tomoefuji seemed to have broken the jinx against performers of the yumitori-shiki ceremony having a successful career in sumo.

In May 1992 he became the only sekitori in his stable, following the retirements of Hokutoumi and Takanofuji. Just a year earlier the stable had had two yokozuna, Hokutoumi and Chiyonofuji.  Tomoefuji's subsequent career was blighted by injuries. He was involved in a training accident with Akebono shortly before the July 1992 tournament, which led to Akebono having to miss his debut tournament as ozeki. Tomoefuji made his debut in the sanyaku ranks at komusubi in that tournament, but had to pull out on the second day. He never managed to return to the rank. Restricted by an injury to his right knee, in September 1993 he was demoted back to the jūryō division after a poor 4-11 record. He missed two tournaments in 1994, falling to the bottom of the division, and in May 1995 he lost sekitori status altogether after falling back to makushita. He fought his last competitive match  in March 1998. He was still listed on the banzuke ranking sheets in September but had fallen to sandanme 85, the lowest rank ever recorded by a former sanyaku wrestler, upon which he announced his retirement from sumo. He left the Sumo Association upon retiring.

Fighting style
Tomoefuji's favourite techniques were hidari-yotsu, (a right hand outside, left hand inside grip on his opponents' mawashi) uwatenage, (overarm throw) and  yorikiri (force out).

Career record

See also
Glossary of sumo terms
List of past sumo wrestlers
List of komusubi

References

External links
Complete career record

1971 births
Living people
People from Kazuno, Akita
Japanese sumo wrestlers
Sumo people from Akita Prefecture
Komusubi
Kokonoe stable sumo wrestlers